Zander (stylized as [zAndEr]) is the sixth album by Scorn, released on February 18, 1997 through KK Records. For Zander, the band kept pushing the dirty bass and heavy beat sound, subtly changing with each subsequent release. In May 1997, Mick Harris decided to end the band to finish relations with KK Records, and from 1997 to 1999, he was making music with other names and other musicians, until 2000, when returned with the band with the record company Hymen Records for Greetings from Birmingham.

Track listing

Personnel 
Anthony Burnham – photography
Mick Harris – instruments, mixing

References

External links 
 

1997 albums
Scorn (band) albums